Crafton Heights is a neighborhood in the 28th Ward of the City of Pittsburgh.

City Steps
The Crafton Heights neighborhood has 9 distinct flights of city steps - many of which are open and in a safe condition. In Crafton Heights, the Steps of Pittsburgh provides residents with a safe way to walk throughout their neighborhood and allow access to public transportation .

Surrounding communities
Crafton Heights is located west of Pittsburgh. It borders the Pittsburgh neighborhoods of Sheraden to the north, Elliott to the east, and Westwood to the south. It also borders the boroughs of Crafton, Pennsylvania to the southwest and Ingram, Pennsylvania to the west.

See also
 List of Pittsburgh neighborhoods

References

Further reading

External links
 Crafton Heights Official Home Page
 Crafton Heights District 2
 Interactive Pittsburgh Neighborhoods Map

Neighborhoods in Pittsburgh